Murder-Set-Pieces is a 2004 American horror film written, produced, and directed by Nick Palumbo. The film stars Sven Garrett and features cameos from horror icons Gunnar Hansen (The Texas Chain Saw Massacre), Cerina Vincent (Cabin Fever), and Tony Todd (Candyman).

Plot

The film follows a wealthy immigrant serial killer: a German photographer, who leads a double life: by day he shoots erotic photos. By night, he rapes, tortures, and murders prostitutes.

Cast
 Sven Garrett as The Photographer
 Gunnar Hansen as The Nazi Mechanic
 Cerina Vincent as Beautiful Girl
 Tony Todd as Clerk
 Jade Risser as Jade
 Edwin Neal as Good Samaritan

Censorship
In comparison with the theatrical cut of the film, the 'R' rated DVD version was missing approximately 22 minutes. Most of the cuts were to obtain the 'R' rating and removed several intense scenes of sexualized violence and torture, however, some scenes were also removed by the director himself which he intended to edit out of the film before going into theaters but never got the chance.

UK ban
The film was submitted for release in the United Kingdom to the British Board of Film Classification (BBFC) who refused to give the film an '18' certificate, therefore making the film illegal to supply within the UK. The BBFC stated they rejected the film because of sexual violence, and the film was potentially breaking UK obscenity laws.

Release
Murder-Set-Pieces was given a limited release on December 24, 2004 with an NC-17 rating. The film was released by Lions Gate Home Entertainment with an 'R' rating on DVD.

The film was released by Universal Studios in Spain, The Weinstein Company in Sweden, 20th Century Fox in France, and Anchor Bay Entertainment in Russia.

Critical reception

The film received generally negative reviews. Rotten Tomatoes reports that 36% of 11 reviews were positive, with an average rating of 3.73/10. On Metacritic, the film has a 13 out of 100 rating, based on 5 critics, signifying "overwhelming dislike".

Debra Birnbaum of the New York Post wrote it "aspires to be a highly stylized exploration of the mind of a serial killer, but it's nothing more than a gory, blood-soaked snuff film, reveling in its own shock value."

Dennis Harvey of Variety said the film evinced "only the slightest interest in narrative or character," and "distinguishes itself via sheer extremity of gore, sadism and tastelessness", and that its "nastiness is so insistent, one-dimensional and excessive it risks self-parody."

Ben Kenigsberg of The Village Voice called it "a movie so utterly degenerate it makes you wish that indie filmmakers had to prove a basic standard of decency in order to buy a camera."

However, Heidi Martinuzzi of Film Threat gave it four stars out of four, calling it "incredibly good" and "well made."

Home media
A director's cut DVD was released after its theatrical run. The theatrical version runs at 105 minutes, the uncut DVD version runs at 91 minutes, whereas the 'R' rated version runs at 83 minutes.

References

External links
 
 
 

2004 films
2000s German-language films
2004 horror films
American horror films
American independent films
Films about cannibalism
Films about pedophilia
Films about prostitution in the United States
Films set in the Las Vegas Valley
Films shot in the Las Vegas Valley
Films about neo-Nazism
Necrophilia in film
Obscenity controversies in film
Films about rape
American serial killer films
Lionsgate films
Films originally rejected by the British Board of Film Classification
American splatter films
2000s English-language films
2000s American films